The 2015 National Cup is the 23rd edition of the Vietnamese Cup. It will be sponsored by Kienlongbank, and known as the Kienlongbank National Cup for sponsorship purposes. It began on the 4 April 2015 and will finish on 26 September 2015.

Teams
Teams in V.League 1 and V.League 2 can enter this cup. There will be a preliminary round, where all 8 teams from V.League 2 and 4 teams in V.League 1: Đồng Nai, Sanna Khánh Hòa, Than Quảng Ninh, and SHB Đà Nẵng will have single-elimination matches to determine the best 6 teams to enter round of 16 with the other 10 teams.

Preliminary round

Main tournament

Bracket

Details

Round of 16

Quarterfinals

Semifinals

Final

References

External links
  Official website

Vietnamese National Cup
Cup